San Kamphaeng is a tambon (subdistrict) of San Kamphaeng District, in Chiang Mai Province, Thailand. In 2005 it had a population of 13,686 people. The tambon contains 14 villages.

Administration
The subdistrict is split into two local administrations: San Kamphaeng town covers the urban centre of San Kamphaeng Subdistrict and parts of Chae Chang Subdistrict, and the remaining part of the subdistrict forms the San Kamphaeng Subdistrict Administrative Organization.

References

Tambon of Chiang Mai province
Populated places in Chiang Mai province